Francisco de Becerra (1510s, Medellín, Extremadura, Spain - ?, Brazil) was a Spanish nobleman, served as captain in the Spanish Army, during the conquest of the New World.

Biography 
Born in Extremadura in the 1510s, Becerra was commander of the brigantine who brought to Mencía Calderón in 1550. On that trip Becerra was accompanied by his wife Isabel, daughter of Álvaro Contreras y Carvajal. He lost his life on the same trip, due to a shipwreck in Mbiazá, Brazil. His wife and children managed to save their lives.

References

External links 
 portalguarani.com

1510s births
16th-century Spanish people
Spanish military personnel killed in action
Spanish conquistadors
Extremaduran conquistadors
Explorers of South America
People who died at sea